Purkyně may refer to:

3701 Purkyně, main belt asteroid with an orbital period of 1709
Jan Evangelista Purkyně (1787–1869), Czech anatomist and physiologist
Karel Purkyně (1834–1868), Czech painter
Purkyně (crater), lunar impact crater on the far side from the Earth
Purkyne fibers in the inner ventricular walls of the heart

See also
Jan Evangelista Purkyně University in Ústí nad Labem (UJEP) in the Czech Republic
PRKY, an enzyme
Kyne